The   (princely house) was the second oldest collateral branch (ōke) of the Japanese Imperial Family created from the Fushimi-no-miya, the oldest of the four branches of the imperial dynasty allowed to provide a successor to the Chrysanthemum throne should the main imperial line fail to produce an heir.

The Kuni-no-miya house was formed in 1871 by Prince Asahiko, fourth son of Prince Fushimi Kuniye, an adopted son of Emperor Ninkō and later a close advisor to Emperor Kōmei and Emperor Meiji. He was the great great grandfather of the present Emperor of Japan, Emperor Naruhito.

On October 14, 1947, Prince Kuni Asaakira and his children lost their imperial status and became ordinary citizens, as part of the American Occupation's abolition of the collateral branches of the Japanese Imperial family.

The Kuni-no-miya palace was located in Azabu, Tokyo. The site is now occupied by the University of the Sacred Heart.

References 

 Lebra, Sugiyama Takie. Above the Clouds: Status Culture of the Modern Japanese Nobility. University of California Press (1995).